Shiraz  (Shiraz: A Romance of India) (Das Grabmal einer großen Liebe in German) is a 1928 silent film, directed by Franz Osten and starring Himansu Rai and Enakshi Rama Rau. It was adapted from a stage play of the same name by Niranjan Pal, and based on the story of the commissioning of the Taj Mahal – the great monument of a Mughul prince for his dead queen.

Plot
Shiraz (Rai) is a potter's son, who is brought up as brother to Selima (Rau), a girl of unknown but royal lineage who was rescued from an ambush in childhood. Shiraz falls in love with Selima as a young adult and when she is kidnapped by slavers and sold to Prince Khurram, Shiraz follows her to Agra, where he will risk a horrible death to protect her and one day design her great memorial.

Cast
 Himansu Rai as Shiraz
 Enakshi Rama Rau as Selima/Empress Mumtaz Mahal
 Charu Roy as Prince Khurram/Emperor Shah Jahan
 Seeta Devi as Dalia

Production
The film was shot in Jaipur. It was an Indian/British/German co-production, and the second of three silent films made on location in India by star and producer Himansu Rai. The others are Prem Sanyas (The Light of Asia, 1926) and A Throw of Dice (Prapanch Pash, 1929).

Restoration
Shiraz was restored from original film elements by the BFI National Archive in 2017, and had its premiere as a gala screening at the 2017 London Film Festival, accompanied by a new score composed and performed by Anoushka Shankar. The Guardian's film critic Peter Bradshaw praised the film as " a startlingly ambitious epic weepie-romance". The restored version subsequently played in a number of venues in India in late 2017. The film was shown as part of the BFI London Film Festival's lineup at We Are One: A Global Film Festival in 2020.

References

External links 
 

1928 films
1928 drama films
British silent feature films
British drama films
British black-and-white films
German silent feature films
German black-and-white films
Indian silent films
Films set in India
Films directed by Franz Osten
UFA GmbH films
Films set in the Mughal Empire
Cultural depictions of Shah Jahan
Films set in Uttar Pradesh
Films shot in Rajasthan
1920s British films
Silent drama films